Bayou Vista is a city in Galveston County, Texas, United States. The population was 1,537 at the 2010 census. It received severe damage from Hurricane Ike on September 13, 2008.

Geography

Bayou Vista is located at  (29.325979, –94.939502).

Demographics

2020 census

As of the 2020 United States census, there were 1,763 people, 1,028 households, and 631 families residing in the city.

2000 census
As of the census of 2000, there were 1,644 people, 784 households, and 508 families residing in the city. The population density was 3,323.5 people per square mile (1,295.4/km2). There were 926 housing units at an average density of 1,872.0 per square mile (729.7/km2). The racial makeup of the city was 94.83% White, 0.55% African American, 0.43% Native American, 0.79% Asian, 0.06% Pacific Islander, 2.37% from other races, and 0.97% from two or more races. Hispanic or Latino of any race were 4.87% of the population.

There were 784 households, out of which 12.1% had children under the age of 18 living with them, 56.9% were married couples living together, 4.2% had a female householder with no husband present, and 35.1% were non-families. 27.0% of all households were made up of individuals, and 7.4% had someone living alone who was 65 years of age or older. The average household size was 2.10 and the average family size was 2.48.

In the city, the population was spread out, with 10.2% under the age of 18, 6.8% from 18 to 24, 26.9% from 25 to 44, 41.4% from 45 to 64, and 14.7% who were 65 years of age or older. The median age was 48 years. For every 100 females, there were 110.2 males. For every 100 females age 18 and over, there were 110.1 males.

The median income for a household in the city was $62,321, and the median income for a family was $70,114. Males had a median income of $52,045 versus $31,467 for females. The per capita income for the city was $30,495. About 0.6% of families and 3.1% of the population were below the poverty line, including none of those under age 18 and 3.9% of those age 65 or over.

Education 
Bayou Vista is served by the Texas City Independent School District (formerly by the La Marque Independent School District). La Marque High School is the designated high school as the LMISD school zones were retained after the 2016 merger with Texas City ISD. Bayou Vista is zoned to La Marque elementary and middle schools: La Marque Primary School, Hayley Elementary, and La Marque Middle School.

The former La Marque District (and the Texas City district) are zoned to the College of the Mainland.

References

External links
 City of Bayou Vista official website
 

Cities in Texas
Cities in Galveston County, Texas
Greater Houston
Populated coastal places in Texas
1985 establishments in Texas
Populated places established in 1985